1981, longer title 1981: L'année où je suis devenu un menteur (1981: The Year I Became a Liar) is a 2009 Canadian French language comedy-drama film from Quebec written and directed by Ricardo Trogi. It was released on September 4, 2009. The film is autobiographical about the youth years of the director as told by him during the film.

Synopsis 
In 1981, 11 year-old Ricardo (Jean-Carl Boucher) and his family arrives to their new home. Having no friends, Ricardo spends his time in a magazine and ask his parents money. During school, his teacher notices his bad calligraphy and assigns him to Anne Tremblay (Elizabeth Adam) to improve his writing; he falls immediately in love with the classmate. Their arrival, however, falls into trouble when the father loses his job and the sister's cat, Caramel, goes missing.

At school, Ricardo tries to gain a reputation after discovering a walkman in order to gain Anne's love. He then befriends the "Red K-Ways" after he lies to promising to give Playboy magazines. During an important school event, Ricardo gives a poor presentation about an important item; Anne presents a marble her deceased cousin gave to her. To get closer to her, Ricardo steals her gift.

After his many lies get suspected by the K-Ways, Ricardo tries to buy a walkman to gain a honest reputation; he encounters his father doing music in a local restaurant. An argument comes with his mother about money and his mother tells him to find a job to pay the things he wants. He then delivers newspapers. Later at home, his father tells Ricardo they have to sell the house.

In the woods, a member of the K-Ways has a meltdown when his father goes to jail; they then revealed they all lied about different topics and they reconcile. Before leaving, Ricardo then decides to go to Anne's home and tells the truth and learns that Anne never had a deceased cousin and the marble was only decorative. Back at home, the family finds Caramel with babies as they depart.

Cast

Sequel
In August 2014, a sequel, 1987, was released, reuniting Jean-Carl Boucher, Sandrine Bisson, Claudio Colangelo, and Rose Adam to play their roles as the Trogis. The sequel tells the story of Ricardo at 17 years old graduating from high school, trying to lose his virginity, open a club, and loads of other things. The film was released in December 2014 on DVD, Blu-Ray, and VHS (for a limited time) as a kind of retro thing.

A third film in the series, 1991, was released in 2018 with largely the same cast.

External links
 

2009 films
2000s coming-of-age comedy-drama films
2000s French-language films
Canadian coming-of-age comedy-drama films
Films directed by Ricardo Trogi
Films set in 1981
Works about Italian-Canadian culture
French-language Canadian films
Quebec films
2000s Canadian films